The EuroBasket 2007 Final was the championship game of the EuroBasket 2007 tournament. The game was played on 16 September 2007 at the Palacio de Deportes de la Comunidad de Madrid in Madrid, Spain.

Russia won their first title after the Soviet Union dissolution by defeating Spain 60–59. Naturalized J.R. Holden scored the last basket with only 2.1 seconds left and Pau Gasol missed the last shot at the buzzer. Andrei Kirilenko was named MVP of the tournament.

Final

Game Statistics

Head coach:  Pepu Hernández

Head coach:  David Blatt

Legend: PTS = points, FT = free-throws (made/attempts), 2-FG = 2-point field goals (made/attempts), 3-PG = 3-point field goals (made/attempts), Rebs = Rebounds

References

FIBA EuroBasket 2007
Sports competitions in Madrid
2007 Final
2007
2007–08 in Spanish basketball
2007–08 in Russian basketball
2007
2007 in Madrid
September 2007 sports events in Europe